The Cape Cod Regional Law Enforcement Council is a regional mutual aid facilitator formed by 43 police agencies in the area on or near Cape Cod, Massachusetts. It pools resources to provide SWAT, a Motor Vehicle Crash Reconstruction Team, a School Resource Officers’ Network and other units in the area. 

A report from the ACLU of Massachusetts found that the CCRLEC was highly militarized and possessed a Lenco BearCat.
 
Agencies that belong to the group include:

References

Cape Cod and the Islands
Law enforcement in Massachusetts